Parfait is an album by bassist Ron Carter which was recorded at Van Gelder Studio in 1980 and released on the Milestone label in 1982.

Track listing
All compositions by Ron Carter except where noted.
 "Parfait" – 4:48
 "New Waltz" – 6:00
 "Receipt, Please" – 7:15
 "Blues for D.P." – 10:33
 "'Round Midnight" (Thelonious Monk, Cootie Williams) – 7:56

Personnel
Ron Carter – piccolo bass
Ted Lo – piano
Leon Maleson – bass
Wilby Fletcher – drums

References

Milestone Records albums
Ron Carter albums
1982 albums
Albums recorded at Van Gelder Studio